is one of five national colleges of maritime technology in Japan. Graduates can earn deck mariner or engineer qualifications.

Maritime colleges in Japan
Universities and colleges in Hiroshima Prefecture